Müsch is a municipality in the district of Ahrweiler, in Rhineland-Palatinate, Germany.

References

Ahrweiler (district)